Henriette Blanke-Belcher (February 16, 1882 – March 1958), also known as Henrietta Blanke-Belcher and later as Henriette B. Melson, was an American composer of popular music, especially waltzes and ragtime tunes.

Early life 
Henriette Berger Blanke was born in Kansas City, Missouri, the eldest of four daughters of Max Blanke and Dora Berger Blanke. Her father was an immigrant from Romania; her mother was from New York City. Henriette was raised in Chicago, and Detroit; her father died in the latter city when she was a teenager.

Career 

Henriette Blanke worked for Whitney-Warner Publishing Company and Jerome H. Remick, music publishing companies in Detroit. They published many of her compositions. She performed in vaudeville in 1909, and a number of recordings of her compositions were made between 1905 and 1926. "I want to become known as a waltz writer exclusively," she said in 1902, but she also wrote ballads and novelty songs.

Compositions by Blanke-Belcher included "Lazarre Waltzes" (1901), "Francezka Waltzes" (1902, named for the novel by Molly Eliot Seawell), "Hearts Courageous: Waltzes" (1902), "Cubanola: A Spanish Love Serenade" (1902), "Under the Rose: Waltzes" (1903), "Peggy O'Neal Waltzes" (1903), "My Wigwam Queen" (1903, words by James O'Dea), "Colleen: An Irish Love Song" (1903, words by Eddie Dustin), "My Lady of the North Waltzes" (1904), "Hearts' Haven Waltzes" (1905),  "When the Mockingbirds are Singing in the Wild Wood" (1906), "Stingy Moon" (1906, words by Will Heelan), "The Enchantress: Waltzes" (1907), "In the Good Old Irish Way" (1907, words by Will Heelan), "I Will Try" (1908, words by B. B. Ellison), "Marsovia: Waltzes" (1908), "The New Barn Dance" (1908), "Ain't You Coming Out To-night" (1909, words by Ren Shields), "Honeyland" (1909, words by Stanley Murphy), "Lonesome Land" (1909, words by Bartley Costello), "I'll Do Anything But" (1909, words by Alfred Bryan), "Telling Lies" (1910, words by Irving Berlin), "Love Dreams" (1910, words by F. J. Crawford), "Maxine: Valse" (1910, named for her young daughter), "Put Your Head Upon my Shoulder" (1910, words by Alfred Bryan), "Just as Long as the Swanee Flows" (1911), "My Irish Girl" (1911, words by Alfred Bryan), "My Only One" (1911, words by William Parquet), "Polaire Waltzes" (1912), and, during World War I, "Loyalty Waltz" (1918).

Personal life 
Henriette Blanke married Frederick E. Belcher, an executive at Jerome H. Remick, in 1905, in Detroit. The couple lived in New York, and had one child, Maxine F. Belcher, born in 1906. They divorced in 1912. She married again in 1918, to a stockbroker, Ralph Melson. She died in 1958, in Miami, Florida.

References

External links 

 Henriette Blanke-Belcher on Discogs.
 Henriette Blanke-Belcher sheet music in the Parlor Salon Sheet Music Collection, DigitalCommons@UMaine.
 Henriette Blanke-Belcher compositions at the National Jukebox, Library of Congress.

1882 births
1958 deaths
People from Kansas City, Missouri
American composers
Vaudeville performers